The Music of Nashville: Season 1, Volume 1 is the debut soundtrack album for the American musical drama television series Nashville, created by Academy Award winner Callie Khouri and starring Connie Britton as Rayna Jaymes, a legendary country music superstar, whose stardom begins fading, and Hayden Panettiere as rising teen star Juliette Barnes. The album was released December 11, 2012, through Big Machine Records.

The album debuted at number 14 on the U.S. Billboard 200, and at number 4 on the Top Country Albums chart, selling 56,000 copies in its first week of release.  The album sold a further 198,000 copies in 2013, making it the sixth best-selling soundtrack album of the year.

Track listing

Deluxe edition

Charts

Weekly charts

Year-end charts

References

Television soundtracks
2012 soundtrack albums
Big Machine Records soundtracks
Country music soundtracks
Music of Nashville: Season 1, Volume 1